Tobeh  is a Syrian village located in Tell Salhab Subdistrict in Al-Suqaylabiyah District, Hama.  According to the Syria Central Bureau of Statistics (CBS), Tobeh had a population of 1045 in the 2004 census.

References 

Populated places in al-Suqaylabiyah District